"I Want Your Love" is the third single from the English rock group Transvision Vamp, released in 1988 from their debut album, Pop Art (1988). It was the band's first UK top-40 hit, reaching number five in July 1988. It also peaked atop the Norwegian Singles Chart the same year and reached number one in South Africa the following year.

Track listings

7-inch single
A1. "I Want Your Love" – 3:20 
B1. "Sweet Thing" – 3:45
B2. "Evolution Evie" (acoustic version) – 2:45

12-inch and German mini-CD single
 "I Want Your Love" (I Don't Want Your Money mix) – 6:18
 "Sweet Thing" – 4:50
 "Evolution Evie" (electric version) – 2:51

UK mini-CD single
 "I Want Your Love" (I Don't Want Your Money Mix) – 6:20
 "Sweet Thing" – 4:50
 "Evolution Evie" (electric version) – 2:51
 "Tell That Girl to Shut Up" – 3:06

US 7-inch and cassette single; Japanese mini-CD single
 "I Want Your Love"
 "Evolution Evie" (electric version)

Charts

Weekly charts

Year-end charts

Nick Skitz and Melissa Tkautz version

Australian DJ/producer Nick Skitz re-recorded "I Want Your Love" featuring the vocals of Melissa Tkautz. This version was released on 7 April 2008 through Destra Entertainment and peaked at number 60 on the Australian ARIA Singles Chart.

Track listing
 "I Want Your Love" (radio mix)
 "I Want Your Love" (Mark Rachelle mix)
 "I Want Your Love" (Disco Nexxion remix)
 "I Want Your Love" (Bohn & Kasten remix)
 "I Want Your Love" (Kamikaze Kid remix)
 "I Want Your Love" (Al Storm remix)

Charts

References

External links
Worldwide releases

1988 singles
1988 songs
MCA Records singles
Melissa Tkautz songs
Number-one singles in Norway
Number-one singles in South Africa
Transvision Vamp songs